Usuk Obio Ediene is a village in Akwa Ibom State in Nigeria, near to Ikot Ekpene, at an elevation of about 144 meters.

Most of the local population belong to the Annang group.

People 

It is the birthplace of Senator Aloysius Akpan Etok, who represents Akwa Ibom North West.

References 

Populated places in Akwa Ibom State